Ekkadiki Pothavu Chinnavada is a 2016 Telugu-language supernatural romantic thriller  film written and directed by Vi Anand and produced by P. V. Rao. It stars Nikhil Siddharth, Hebah Patel, Nandita Swetha and Avika Gor. The film has dialogues by Abburi Ravi, music composed by Shekar Chandra, cinematography by Sai Sriram, and editing by Chota K. Prasad. It released on 18 November 2016 to positive reviews from critics and audiences and was commercially Blockbuster. It is being remade into Tamil as Aayiram Jenmangal.

Plot
Arjun, after finishing his exam, waits at marriage registrar office for his girlfriend Ayesha to arrive and marry her, but Ayesha does not show up, leaving Arjun heartbroken. A few years later, Kishore, a cousin of Arjun's friend, becomes mentally disturbed and feels possessed by a spirit in his body. For treatment, Arjun takes Kishore to Kerala. While Kishore is being treated, Arjun is attracted to a girl named Amala, who reminds him of Ayesha. After finishing Kishore's treatment, Arjun is once again left heartbroken as Amala leaves the place without even informing him. Arjun goes after Amala to her village, Vijayawada, and gets shocked by knowing that Amala met with an accident four years back and the girl whom he met in Kerala is not Amala. Back in Hyderabad, Arjun meets the girl who posed to be Amala and finds that her actual name is Nithya and gets to know that in the past, Nithya was possessed by a spirit whose name was Amala and Nithya went to Kerala for treatment.

Gradually, Nithya and Arjun grow closer,  but at that time, Amala's spirit enters another girl's body whose name is Parvathi and comes to Arjun's house. Arjun, although tensed, maintains normal behaviour with Amala. Gradually Arjun's close behavior with Nithya makes Amala furious and emotional as she becomes possessive about Arjun. At that point, Amala reveals the truth that she is none other than Ayesha, whose actual name is Amala but Arjun thought it was Ayesha - the same girl whom Arjun was supposed to get married, but unfortunately on the day of marriage, she meets with an accident and dies on the spot. She says that she saved the girl named Parvathi when she was attempting suicide because she was supposed to marry her uncle, whom she does not like.

After hearing all this, Arjun feels guilty and sad that he could not identify her. He tries to stop her, but Amala does not pay heed to any of his pleas. Amala feels that Arjun no longer loves her and leaves Parvathi's body. After gaining consciousness, Parvathi is unable to recognize Arjun, and at this point of time, Parvathi's uncle comes there and beats up Arjun. When he is about to kill Arjun, Amala once again enters Parvathi's body and saves Arjun. While in the hospital, Amala gets to know from Nithya that Arjun is still in love with her and that is why he said no to Nithya's proposal, but at this time, Kishore, with the help of a Swamiji, makes Amala's soul leave Parvathi's body and captures it. Swami consoles Arjun that it is against God's will for a soul to live on earth after death. A few months later, Arjun meets Nithya on the road and he finds that some of her behaviour resembles that of Amala's (it is shown in the credits that the bottle in which Amala was captured is now broken, implying that it was Amala in Nithya's body again) and ends up proposing to her for marriage. At the same time, Parvathi returns home, but her uncle says to marry the guy of her choice and runs away because of her behaviour in Arjun's house.

Cast

Soundtrack 

The film's soundtrack was released on 11 November 2016. The soundtrack has 4 songs. The music is composed by Shekhar Chandra.

Reception

Accolades

References

External links 

2010s Telugu-language films
2016 horror films
2016 films
Indian supernatural horror films
Indian romantic fantasy films
Indian romantic thriller films
Indian horror thriller films
Indian supernatural thriller films
Indian romantic horror films
2010s romantic thriller films
2010s supernatural horror films
2010s romantic fantasy films
2016 horror thriller films